Groundhogs are an English blues and rock band founded in late 1963, that toured extensively in the 1960s, achieved prominence in the early 1970s, and continued sporadically into the 21st century. Tony McPhee (guitar and vocals) is the sole constant member of the group, which has gone through many personnel changes, but usually records and performs as a power trio.

Career
The band was originally formed as the Dollar Bills in New Cross, London, in 1962 by brothers Pete and John Cruickshank (born in 1943 and 1945 respectively in Calcutta, West Bengal, India). Tony McPhee (born 22 March 1944), the lead guitarist in the instrumental group the Seneschals, joined the group later that year. McPhee steered them towards the blues and renamed them after a John Lee Hooker song, "Groundhog's Blues".

At John Cruickshank's suggestion, they became John Lee's Groundhogs when they backed Hooker on his 1964 UK tour. They later supplemented Little Walter, Jimmy Reed and Champion Jack Dupree when they toured the UK. McPhee featured on Dupree's From New Orleans to Chicago (1966) alongside Eric Clapton. Groundhogs issued "Shake It" b/w "Rock Me" on the Interphon record label in January 1965.

The line-up on their first album, Scratchin' the Surface, produced by the 19-year-old head of A&R for Liberty Records, Mike Batt, and released in November 1968, consisted of McPhee as singer and guitarist, bassist Peter Cruickshank (born 2 July 1945), Ken Pustelnik (born 13 March 1946 on a farm near Blairgowrie, Angus, Scotland) on drums and Steve Rye (born 8 March 1946 in London – died 19 July 1992, in London) on harmonica. In 1969, the single "B.D.D." (Blind Deaf Dumb), taken from Blues Obituary, flopped in the UK but hit number one in Lebanon.

The group's next four album releases, Blues Obituary (September 1969), Thank Christ for the Bomb (May 1970), Split (March 1971) and Who Will Save the World? The Mighty Groundhogs (March 1972), were recorded as a trio without Rye; all but Blues Obituary reached the Top 10 in the UK Albums Chart. Split reached number 5, spending 27 weeks in the UK Albums Chart and achieved gold record status, while a single release from the album, "Cherry Red", was featured on BBC Television's Top of the Pops programme on 15 April 1971.

They supported the Rolling Stones on their 1971 British tour at the request of Mick Jagger and released an album of their live set on the tour, recorded at Leeds University and called Live at Leeds. All these albums and live shows were performed by the classic power trio of Cruickshank, McPhee and Pustelnik. Pustelnik left in 1972 and Clive Brooks from the band Egg joined on drums for Hogwash, released in November 1972. The Solid album of 1974 saw a last return to the charts.

After breaking up in 1974, they returned in 1975 with a different line-up. Two albums, Crosscut Saw and Black Diamond, were released in 1976. At times in the 1990s, McPhee alternated two line-ups. After years of performing and recording for a loyal following, original manager Roy Fisher put together a short-lived 'original line-up' to celebrate their fortieth anniversary. McPhee left the band again to pursue an acoustic career, leaving Cruickshank and Pustelnik to continue, subsequently forming 'The Groundhogs Rhythm Section' with invited frontmen, latterly with Eddie Martin, while McPhee embarked on a major tour in 2004 with Edgar Winter and Alvin Lee and issued an acoustic blues album Blues at Ten.

McPhee put together a new band in 2007, with long-time Groundhogs bassist Dave Anderson (ex-Hawkwind) and Marco Anderson on drums. This trio toured the UK in 2008 with Focus and Martin Turner's Wishbone Ash. The 2009 line-up of Tony McPhee's Groundhogs comprised McPhee, Anderson and previous long-term drummer Mick Jones. The Groundhogs Rhythm Section's latest recruits, Bob Bowles (guitar, vocals) and Jon Buckett (guitars, keyboards, vocals), joined Ken Pustelnik and Pete Cruickshank in February 2011. As of 2011, the new Groundhogs' lineup consisted of McPhee, Anderson, Joanna Deacon (vocals), and Carl Stokes (drums) from the death rock band Cancer. Due to McPhee's ongoing health issues relating to a stroke in 2009, Tony McPhee & Groundhogs retired in January 2014, although Tony McPhee and Carl Stokes have since worked with David Tibet's Current 93.

Music

Groundhogs initially formed as a blues band, but subsequently began incorporating elements of psychedelic, progressive music and space rock into their sound. This style has been classified as blues rock, acid rock, hard rock, psychedelic blues and progressive rock.

Personnel

Members

Current members
 Joanna Deacon – vocals (2001–2003, 2011–present)
 Tony McPhee – guitars, vocals (1963–1974, 1976, 1982–2004, 2007–present)
 Dave Anderson – bass (1987–1988, 2001–2003, 2007–present)
 Carl Stokes – drums (2011–present)

Former members

 Peter Cruickshank – bass (1963–1974, 2003–2004)
 Dave Boorman – drums (1963–1965)
 Bob Hall – keyboards (1963–1965)
 John Cruickshank – harmonica, vocals (1963–1964)
 Ken Pustelnik – drums (1965–1972, 2003–2004)
 Tom Parker – keyboards (1965)
 Steve Rye – harmonica (1969; died 1992)
 Clive Brooks – drums (1972–1974; died 2017)
 Dave Thompson – bass (1972)
 Mick Cook – drums (1976; died 1997)
 Martin Kent – bass (1976)
 Dave Wellbelove – guitars (1976)
 Rick Adams – guitars (1976)
 Alan Fish – bass (1982–1994)
 Wilgar Campbell – drums (1982–1984; died 1989)
 "Mighty" Joe Young – guitars (1982–1983)
 Mick Kirton – drums (1984–1989)
 Mick Jones – drums (1989–1994, 2000–2003, 2009–2011)
Chris Bennett – drums (1990–1991)
 Jon Camp – bass (1989, 2001)
 Eric Chipulina – bass, live guitars (1994–1996, 1996–2000)
 Pete Correa – drums (1994–1996, 1996–2000)
 Pete Chymon – bass (1996)
 Dale Iviss – drums (1996)
 Brian Jones – bass (2000–2001)
 Marco Anderson – drums (2007–2009)

Lineups

The Groundhogs rhythm section

Current members
 Bob Bowles – guitars, vocals (2011–present)
 Jon Buckett – guitars, keyboards, vocals (2011–present)
 Peter Cruickshank – bass (2004–present)
 Ken Pustelnik – drums (2004–present)

Former members
 Chas Depaolo – guitars, vocals (2004–2006)
 Dave Weld – guitars, vocals (2004–2006)
 Eddie Martin – guitars, vocals (2006–2011)

Discography

Albums
as Groundhogs:

Studio albums
 Scratching the Surface (December 1968)
 Blues Obituary (September 1969)
 Thank Christ for the Bomb (May 1970) – UK Number 9
 Split (March 1971) – UK Number 5
 Who Will Save the World? The Mighty Groundhogs (March 1972) – UK Number 8, US Number 202
 Hogwash (November 1972) 
 Solid (June 1974) – UK Number 31
 Crosscut Saw (February 1976)
 Black Diamond (October 1976)
 Razor's Edge (May 1985)
 Back Against the Wall (1987)
 Hogs in Wolf's Clothing (January 1998)
 The Muddy Waters Song Book (April 1999)

Live
 Hoggin' the Stage (April 1984) - Recorded in Leeds and London in 1971 & Stockholm in 1976.
 Extremely Live (July 1988)
 Hogs on the Road (June 1988) - Recorded in Germany in December 1987
 No Surrender (August 1989) 
 Groundhog Night (July 1993)
 Who Said Cherry Red? (October 1996)
 Live at Leeds 71 (August 1998) - Featuring the 5 tracks recorded in Leeds previously released on "Hoggin' The Stage".
 No Surrender – Razors Edge Tour 1985 (1998) - Recorded in Northfleet, Kent in 1985
 UK Tour '76 (1999)
 U.S. Tour '72 (1999) (Akarma Records)
 Live at the Astoria (September 2001) - Recorded at the Astoria, London on 20th February 1998.
 Live at the New York Club, Switzerland 1991 (2007)
 Live at Anti WAA Festival 1989 (CD, 2014; Nibelung Records)
 Christmas Marketing in Weiden (Download 2017) (Nibelung Records)
 Road Hogs: Live from Richmond to Pocono (3LP/2CD, 2021) (Fire Records) - Live at Richmond Athletic Ground, London, England, 7th November 1969 & at Pocono Raceway, Pennsylvania, USA, on 8th July 1972.

Compilations
  Groundhogs Best 1969-1972 (March 1974)
 Moving Fast, Standing Still (May 1986) - compilation of Razor's Edge and Two Side Of T.S. McPhee plus 4 mid 60's tracks.
  The Best Of (May 1997) - compilation from first 6 studio albums.
  54146 (October 2001) - compilation of Back Against The Wall and Hogs On The Road.
  Thank Christ For The Groundhogs: The Liberty Years (1968-1972) (2010)
  The United Artists Years (1972-1976) (2013)

Tony McPhee (solo):
The Two Sides Of T.S. McPhee (1973)
The Blues and the Beast (1991) (Nibelung Records)
Foolish Pride (February 1993)
Slide, T.S., Slide (1996)
Bleaching the Blues (April 1997)

With John Lee Hooker:
 ...And Seven Nights with John Lee Hooker (Verve Folkways, 1965)

DVDs and videos
Live at the Astoria (1999) [video]
60/40 Split (2005) [DVD]
Live at Anti WAA Festival 1989 (DVD, 2014; Nibelung Records)

References

Bibliography

External links
 [ Groundhogs biography at the AMG website]
 Groundhogs & Tony McPhee's Official Website
 Fan Site with complete Discography
 Tony McPhee's MySpace page
 Rare photos & video clips
 Groundhogs at Fire Records

English blues musical groups
English blues rock musical groups
English progressive rock groups
Psychedelic musical groups
Liberty Records artists
United Artists Records artists
Transatlantic Records artists
Fire Records (UK) artists
Vertigo Records artists